The Union Fire Protection District, abbreviated UFPD and also known as Union Fire/Rescue, has primary responsibility for fire suppression & emergency medical services for the city of Union, Kentucky and outlying areas. The Union Fire Department was established in 1969. The Union Ambulance District was founded September 10, 1989. The two departments were united in 2000.

Today UFPD operates 3 engines, 1 aerial ladder truck, 3 ambulances, 1 tanker, 1 brush truck, 1 utility truck, and 3 command vehicles out of two stations. The department also has a 35-foot fire safety trailer acquired with a grant from the Federal Emergency Management Agency.

The Fire Chief is currently Chief Michael Morgan.

Fire Stations and Apparatus
Note: For Units without a number listed it is still undetermined how they will be renumbered

Retired Apparatus

Engine 651- 1991 HME/Grumman (1500 GPM/1000 Gallon Tank)
Quad   654- 1985 Ford/American  (1000 GPM/450 Gallon Tank)
Engine 653- 1981 Ford/Allegheny (750 GPM/750 Gallon Tank)
Tanker 671- 1971 Ford/Bluegrass (1800 Gallon Tank)
Engine 651- 1973 Ford/Clintonville (1000 GPM/750 Gallon Tank)
Truck 673- 1972 Ford/US Truck (HAZMAT Supply Unit)
Squad 664- 2007 Ford/PL Custom (ALS Ambulance)
Brush 667- GMC 2500 (Brush Truck)

Controversy
On 3 May 2012, fire crews responded to a home in Union, near Station 2. Firefighters were required to truck in water using one of the two tankers the department has. The family assumed that because they lived across the street from a fire hydrant, that it could be used. Upon being asked by reporters, Chief Michael Morgan replied " Believe it or not, the hydrants here on Beaver Road cannot be used due to the water pressure being too high." The Boone County Water District has provided an apparatus for the UFPD to use. When asked about why the apparatus was not used, Chief Morgan replied simply, " The apparatus provided by the water district does not lower the pressure enough." The issue remains to this day.

Notable Incidents

Bill's Carpet fire

On January 21, 2012 Union firefighters responded to a carpet shop on Longbranch Road in Union. Finding a bigger fire than expected, more crews from Burlington, Hebron, Erlanger, and Walton were dispatched. The Florence Fire/EMS Department had already deployed to the fire. TANK buses were brought in to serve as rest areas for crews, which rotated approximately every 15 to 20 minutes.

References

External links
 Union Fire Protection District homepage
 Northern Kentucky Fire Apparatus Union page

Union, Kentucky
Fire departments in Kentucky
Fire protection districts in the United States